Falešný hráč is a 1913 Austro-Hungarian drama film directed by Jaroslav Hurt.

Cast
 Anna Sedlácková
 Rudolf Kafka
 Jaroslav Hurt
 Jára Sedlácek
 Vilém Rittershain
 Jirí Dimmer
 Alois Sedlácek

External links
 

1913 drama films
1913 films
Austrian black-and-white films
Hungarian black-and-white films
Austrian silent films
Austrian drama films
Hungarian drama films
Austro-Hungarian films
Silent drama films
Lost Czech films